Derek Benz (born October 27, 1971) is an American writer of fantasy fiction for children, co-author with J. S. Lewis of the Grey Griffins series, originally published by Scholastic, Inc.

Benz was born in Van Meter, Iowa. Some year ago he lived in Phoenix with his wife and son.

Published books
Grey Griffins series by Benz and J.S. Lewis
 The Revenge of the Shadow King (Orchard Books, March 2006)
 The Rise of the Black Wolf (January 2007)
 The Fall of the Templar (January 2008)
 Clockwork Chronicles: The Brimstone Key (Little, Brown, June 2010)
 Clockwork Chronicles: The Relic Hunters (May 2011)
 Clockwork Chronicles: The Paragon Prison (May 2012)
 A Grey Griffin Companion (July 2013)

References

External links

 

1971 births
Living people
American children's writers
American fantasy writers
American male novelists
People from Van Meter, Iowa
21st-century American novelists
Novelists from Iowa
21st-century American male writers